All Saints' Church is a church in Monkwearmouth, Sunderland, England.  A parish of All Saints was formed in 1844 when it became clear that there was no longer enough room in the only parish church for Monkwearmouth (St Peter's), and a church for the new parish was completed and consecrated in 1849.  One of its vicars was Alexander Boddy, and so All Saints' became known as the birthplace of modern British Pentecostalism.  All Saints' is now again part of the parish of Monkwearmouth.

External links
Parish homepage

Church of England church buildings in Tyne and Wear
Grade II listed churches in Tyne and Wear
Churches in the City of Sunderland
Sunderland